J. Eric Smith (born 1957), former President of Swiss Re Americas, and is an American citizen.

Career
J. Eric Smith, former President and CEO Swiss Re Americas, is an American insurance industry executive.  Smith joined Swiss Re, and the Swiss Re Group Management Board, in July 2011; he was named to the Swiss Re Group Executive Committee in January 2012.  He was responsible for Swiss Re’s Property & Casualty and Life & Health reinsurance businesses, and had operational oversight of Swiss Re's business interests in the Americas as its regional president.

A career-long advocate of deploying technology to make insurance more accessible, Smith has also emphasized the role the reinsurance sector plays in both macro- and microeconomic resilience, especially in uncertain and hazardous conditions like those influenced by climate change and economic difficulty. In January 2014 Smith spoke at the 2014 Investor Summit on Climate Risk at the United Nations in New York.

Smith’s career encompasses both the business-to-business and retail sides of the insurance industry. He began his career as multi-line insurance agent with Country Financial in Monticello, IL. He spent over 20 years at Country Financial, helping to build its Property & Casualty business as VP of marketing. He joined Allstate and became President of Allstate Financial Services in 2006, where he was responsible for its agency line of business. He joined USAA as President of USAA Life Insurance Co. in 2009, where he led the effort to broaden access to the company's life and annuity products through direct distribution channels.

Smith was born in 1957 in Bloomington, IL. He holds a degree in Finance from the University of Illinois; and an MBA from the Kellogg Graduate School of Management.

Smith serves on the Boards of the American Council for Life Insurers (ACLI), American Insurance Association (AIA) and the Financial Services Roundtable (FSR) and is a member of the Committee for Economic Development (CED).

References 
J. Eric Smith appointed President and CEO, Swiss Re Americas

External links
 Eric Smith bio on Swiss Re website 
 Eric Smith Climate change has fundamentally changed the long-term risk landscape, Thomson Reuters
 Eric Smith speaking at the UN Investors Summit
 Insurance executives promote green investments, resilient cities, interview with BestTV
 Financial Emergencies
 Eric Smith advocating for the renewal of the Terrorism Risk Insurance Act in front of the House Committee of Financial Services 
 Swiss Re Girds for Future Shocks, interview with Bloomberg Businessweek
 Eric Smith on 
 One Year after Sandy, Storm Surge Concerns Remain, interview with Best TV 
 Eric Smith speaking at Climate Group's launch of Climate Week 2013 at the NASDAQ
 Eric Smith speaking at the Rockefeller Foundation Centennial in Washington, DC, 2012 
 Eric Smith joins Secretary of State Hillary Clinton on Oct. 7, 2011 to discuss foreign direct investment
 Eric Smith testifying on July 28, 2011 at an insurance oversight hearing of a US House Financial Services Committee subcommittee
 Eric Smith participated in Swiss Ambassador Francois Barras' panel in New York City on Swiss foreign direct investment in the US on November 27, 2012

1957 births
Businesspeople in insurance
Kellogg School of Management alumni
Living people